Rudolf Hill (born 14 March 1948) is an Austrian weightlifter. He competed at the 1972 Summer Olympics and the 1976 Summer Olympics.

References

1948 births
Living people
Austrian male weightlifters
Olympic weightlifters of Austria
Weightlifters at the 1972 Summer Olympics
Weightlifters at the 1976 Summer Olympics
Sportspeople from Vienna
20th-century Austrian people